José Antonio Celaya (born November 3, 1981 in Salinas, California) was an American professional boxer in the Middleweight division and is the former WBO NABO Welterweight Champion.

Professional career
On February 9, 2008 Celaya lost to title contender, Mexican Julio César Chávez, Jr. at the Domo De La Feria in León, Guanajuato, Mexico.

References

External links

American boxers of Mexican descent
Boxers from California
Middleweight boxers
1981 births
Living people
Sportspeople from Salinas, California
American male boxers